Austria competed at the 1936 Summer Olympics in Berlin, Germany. 234 competitors, 217 men and 17 women, took part in 105 events in 19 sports.

Medalists

Athletics

Boxing

Canoeing

Cycling

Ten cyclist, all male, represented Austria in 1936.

Individual road race
 Virgilius Altmann
 Hans Höfner
 Eugen Schnalek
 Karl Kühn

Team road race
 Virgilius Altmann
 Hans Höfner
 Eugen Schnalek
 Karl Kühn

Sprint
 Franz Dusika

Time trial
 Alfred Mohr

Tandem
 Franz Dusika
 Alfred Mohr

Team pursuit
 Josef Genschieder
 Josef Moser
 Karl Schmaderer
 Karl Wölfl

Diving

Equestrian

Fencing

15 fencers, 12 men and 3 women, represented Austria in 1936.

Men's foil
 Josef Losert
 Karl Sudrich
 Josef Ritz

Men's team foil
 Hans Lion, Roman Fischer, Hans Schönbaumsfeld, Ernst Baylon, Josef Losert, Karl Sudrich

Men's épée
 Karl Hanisch
 Roman Fischer
 Rudolf Weber

Men's team épée
 Karl Hanisch, Hans Schönbaumsfeld, Roman Fischer, Hugo Weczerek, Rudolf Weber

Men's sabre
 Josef Losert
 Hubert Loisel
 Karl Sudrich

Men's team sabre
 Josef Losert, Hugo Weczerek, Karl Sudrich, Hubert Loisel, Karl Hanisch, Karl Kaschka

Women's foil
 Ellen Müller-Preis
 Elisabeth Grasser
 Friedrieke Wenisch-Filz

Football

Men's Team Competition
Eduard Kainberger
Josef Lagofsky
Martin Kargl
Ernst Kuenz
Anton Krenn
Karl Wahlmueller
Max Hofmeister
Walter Werginz
Adolf Laudon
Klement Steinmetz
Josef Kitzmueller
Franz Fuchsberger
Franz Mandl
Karl Kainberger
Josef Ksander
Ernst Bacher
Alois Homschak
Anton Kleindienst
Leo Schaffelhofer
Karl Schreiber

Gymnastics

Handball

Modern pentathlon

Two male pentathletes represented Austria in 1936.

 Karl Leban
 Alfred Guth

Rowing

Austria had nine rowers participate in four out of seven rowing events in 1936.
 Men's single sculls
 Josef Hasenöhrl

 Men's double sculls
 Fritz Moser
 Hermann Kubik

 Men's coxless pair
 Heinz Gattringer
 Max Colli

 Men's coxless four
 Rudolf Höpfler
 Camillo Winkler
 Wilhelm Pichler
 Hans Binder

Sailing

Open

Shooting

Three shooters represented Austria in 1936.
Men

Swimming

Water polo

Weightlifting

Wrestling

Art competitions

References

External links
Official Olympic Reports
International Olympic Committee results database

Nations at the 1936 Summer Olympics
1936
1936 in Austrian sport